Hola  (Holia) is a village in the administrative district of Gmina Biała Podlaska, within Biała Podlaska County, Lublin Voivodeship, in eastern Poland.

References

External links
 

Villages in Biała Podlaska County